Faba Forest Park is a forest park in the Gambia. Established on January 1, 1954, it covers 517.3 hectares.

The estimated altitude of the park is 33 meters.

References
  

Protected areas established in 1954
Forest parks of the Gambia